Qadi Baydawi (also known as Naṣir ad-Din al-Bayḍawi, also spelled  Baidawi, Bayzawi and Beyzavi; d. June 1319, Tabriz) was a Persian jurist, theologian, and Quran commentator. He lived during the post-Seljuk and early Mongol era. Many commentaries have been written on his work. He was also the author of several theological treatises.

He lived in the period of the Salghurids. Iranian region was a sheltered place because the Salgurs got along with the Mongols in this period. For this reason, this region became a safe region preferred by scholars. He also benefited from the scholars who came here. Details about his life are available in his book titled al-Gayah al-Kusvâ. 

Baydawi's only Persian work, the Kitab Nizam al-Tawarikh, is the first historical book to showcase the ethno-national history of Iran.

Biography 
Baydawi was a native of Bayda (from which his nisba was derived), a small town in the Fars region of southern Iran. Since 1148, the region had been controlled by the Salghurids, a family of Turkoman origin, who would rule as nominal vassals of the Seljuks, the Khwarazmshahs, and the Mongols until their downfall in 1282. Baydawi's date of birth is unknown, however, assessing his accomplishments throughout his career, it can be deduced that he was born sometime during the reign of the Salghurid atabeg (ruler) Abu Bakr ibn Sa'd. During this period, culture flourished in Fars; Abu Bakr ordered the construction of many hospitals and high-level religious establishments which attracted many scholars. 

Like the majority of the population of Fars, Baydawi was a Sunni Muslim of the Shafi'ite madhhab (school). Baydawi's education is obscure. According to the historian al-Yafi'i, Baydawi was tutored by his father Umar, who had been a student of Mujir-ad-Din Mahmud ibn Abi-al-Mubarak al-Baghdadi ash-Shafi'i, a former student of Mui'in-ad-Din Abi-Sa'id Mansur ibn Umar al-Baghdadi, who had studied under the prominent Persian philosopher al-Ghazali (died 1111).

Works 
al-Baydawi wrote on many subjects, including fiqh (jurisprudence), history, Arabic grammar, tafsir and theology.

His major work is the commentary on the Qur'an entitled The Lights of Revelation and the Secrets of Interpretation (Anwar al-Tanzil wa-Asrar al-Ta'wil)'''. This work is largely a condensed and amended edition of al-Zamakhshari's (al-Kashshaf). That work, which displays great learning, is affected by Mu'tazilite views, which al-Baydawi has tried to amend, sometimes by refuting them and sometimes by omitting them. cites cf. Th. Nöldeke's Geschichte des Qorans, Göttingen, 1860, p. 29 In addition to drawing heavily from al-Kashshaf, al-Baydawi's tafsir also relied on the tafsirs of Fakhr al-Din al-Razi and al-Raghib al-Isfahani. It has been edited by Heinrich Leberecht Fleischer (2 vols., Leipzig, 1846-1848; indices ed. W. Fell, Leipzig, 1878). A selection with numerous notes was edited by D. S. Margoliouth as Chrestomathia Beidawiana (London, 1894), and his commentary on Sūra 12 was edited and translated by A. F. L. Beeston.

His historical work Nizam al-Tawarikh (The Ordering of Histories) was written in Persian, his native language. It seems to be part of an effort to encourage Abaqa Khan, the Buddhist ruler of Iraq to legitimize Ilkhanate rule in Iraq by conversion to Islam. This work played a key-role in the formation of the ethno-national history of Iran, being the first book devoted to its national history.

His theological/kalamic work "Tawali' al-Anwar min Matali' al-Anzar" is about the logic of kalam in the Islamic theological tradition.

His other works: al-Gayah al-Kusvâ, Minhaj al-Usul ila Ilm al-Usul, Lub al-Albâb, Risala fî Ta'rifat al-Ulûm, Tuhfeh al-Abrâr, Havâs al-Quran.

 See also 
 List of Ash'aris and Maturidis
 List of Muslim theologians

References

Sources
 
 
  
  This in turn cites:
 C. Brockelmann, Geschichte der arabischen Litteratur'' (Weimar, 1898), vol. i. pp. 416–418.
 
 
  
 
 

Asharis
Shafi'is
Quranic exegesis scholars
13th-century Muslim scholars of Islam
Sunni Muslim scholars of Islam
13th-century Muslim theologians
Mujaddid
1226 births
1319 deaths
13th-century jurists
13th-century Iranian people
Scholars of the Ilkhanate
People under the Salghurids